KELT-2Ab is an extrasolar planet that orbits the star KELT-2A approximately 440 light-years away in the constellation of Auriga. It was discovered by the KELT-North survey via the transit method, so both its mass and radius are known quite precisely. As of its discovery KELT-2Ab is the fifth-brightest transiting Hot Jupiter known that has a well constrained mass. This makes the KELT-2A system a promising target for future space- and ground-based follow-up observations to learn about the planet's atmosphere.

The water vapour was detected in planetary atmosphere in 2018. 

The star KELT-2A is a member of the common-proper-motion binary star system KELT-2 (HD 42176). KELT-2B is an early K dwarf approximately 295 astronomical units away.

See also
 KELT
KELT-9b
KELT-1
KELT-10
KELT-11b

References

External links
 KELT-North survey website 
 
 KELT-2Ab discovery lightcurve, with music

Auriga (constellation)
Hot Jupiters
Transiting exoplanets
Exoplanets discovered in 2012
Giant planets
Exoplanets discovered by KELT